The 1975 GP Ouest-France was the 39th edition of the GP Ouest-France cycle race and was held on 28 August 1975. The race started and finished in Plouay. The race was won by Cyrille Guimard.

General classification

References

1975
1975 in road cycling
1975 in French sport
August 1975 sports events in Europe